Three ships of the Royal Navy have borne the name HMS St Andrew, after Saint Andrew, patron saint of Scotland:

 was a 50-gun galleon captured from the Spanish in 1596 and given away in 1604.
 was a 42-gun great ship (subsequently second rate) launched in 1622.  She was known as Andrew during the Commonwealth, but regained her original name after the Restoration. She was wrecked in 1666.
 was a 96-gun first-rate ship of the line launched in 1670. She was renamed HMS Royal Anne in 1703 and rebuilt as a 100-gun first rate. She was broken up in 1727, but remained listed until 1756.

Royal Navy ship names